The Market Daily (traditional Chinese: 市場報; simplified Chinese: 市场报), also translated into English as Market Newspaper or Market News or is an economic newspaper based in Beijing, sponsored and owned by People's Daily Agency.

Market Daily was launched on October 1, 1979, after receiving approval from the Secretariat of the Chinese Communist Party. It is the first economic newspaper after China's Reform and opening up.

In April 2009, print version of Market Daily was discontinued. On June 1, its digital edition was launched.  Currently, the newspaper is only available in digital newsletter format.

References

Chinese-language newspapers (Simplified Chinese)
Daily newspapers published in China
Defunct newspapers published in China
Newspapers established in 1979
Online newspapers with defunct print editions
People's Daily
Publications disestablished in 2009